Gorter or De Gorter is a Dutch-language occupational surname for a person growing barley. Notable people with the surname include:

 Arnold Marc Gorter (1866–1933), Dutch landscape painter
 Cornelis Jacobus Gorter (1907–1980), Dutch physicist
 David de Gorter (1717–1783), Dutch physician and botanist
 Donny Gorter (born 1988), Dutch soccer player, son of Edwin
 Edwin Gorter (born 1963), Dutch soccer player, father of Donny
  (1689–1762), Dutch physician and father of David de Gorter

See also 
 
 Gruijters, Dutch surname with the same origin

References 

Dutch-language surnames
Occupational surnames